Barry Gordon Buzan, FBA, FAcSS (born 28 April 1946) is a British political scientist. He is an Emeritus Professor of International Relations at the London School of Economics and a honorary professor at the University of Copenhagen and Jilin University. Until 2012 he was Montague Burton Professor of International Relations at the LSE. Buzan sketched the Regional Security Complex Theory and is therefore together with Ole Wæver a central figure of the Copenhagen School.

Career 
From 1988 to 2002 he was Project Director at the Copenhagen Peace Research Institute (COPRI). From 1995 to 2002 he was research Professor of International Studies at the University of Westminster, and before that Professor of International Studies at the University of Warwick. During 1993 he was visiting professor at the International University of Japan, and in 1997-8 he was Olof Palme Visiting Professor in Sweden.

He was Chairman of the British International Studies Association 1988-90, Vice-President of the (North American) International Studies Association 1993-4, and founding Secretary of the International Studies Coordinating Committee 1994-8. From 1999 to 2011 he was the general coordinator of a project to reconvene the English school of international relations theory, and from 2004 to 2008 he was editor of the European Journal of International Relations. In 1998 he was elected a fellow of the British Academy, and in 2001 he was elected to the Academy of Learned Societies for the Social Sciences.

Research interests 
Buzan defines his interests as:

the conceptual and regional aspects of international security;
international history, and the evolution of the international system since prehistory;
international relations theory, particularly structural realism;
international society, and the 'English School' approach to International Relations.

Buzan was a major contributor to the Copenhagen School of political thought, being the first to the various forms of securitization by the state. Buzan connected this concept to regional security complex theory.

Personal life 
Buzan was born in London, but his family emigrated to Canada in 1954. He holds the citizenships of the United Kingdom and Canada, Buzan is a graduate of the University of British Columbia (1968) where he started an uncompleted master programme. He received his doctorate at the London School of Economics (1973). He describes his political views as social democratic and his religious views as extreme secularist.

Buzan's wife, Deborah Skinner, is an artist and youngest daughter of psychologist B. F. Skinner. They have no children. His brother was author Tony Buzan, with whom he co-authored The Mind Map Book.

Works
Buzan has published extensively, his most important works include:
People, States & Fear: The National Security Problem in International Relations  (1983; revised second edition 1991)
The Logic of Anarchy: Neorealism to Structural Realism (1993) with Charles Jones and Richard Little
Security: A New Framework for Analysis (1997) with Ole Waever, Jaap De Wilde 
The Arms Dynamic in World Politics (1998) with Eric Herring
The Mind Map Book (2000) with Tony Buzan
Regions and Powers: The Structure of International Security (2003) with Ole Waever
The United States and the Great Powers: World Politics in the Twenty-First Century (2004)
From International to World Society? English School Theory and the Social Structure of Globalisation (2004) 
The Evolution of International Security Studies (2009) with Lene Hansen.
Non-Western International Relations Theory: Perspectives on and beyond Asia (2010) editor with Amitav Acharya.
An Introduction to the English School of International Relations: The Societal Approach (2014).
The Global Transformation: History, Modernity and the Making of International Relations (2015) with George Lawson
The Making of Global International Relations: Origins and Evolution of IR at its Centenary (2019) with Amitav Acharya

Awards
Buzan won the American Society of International Law's 1982 Francis Deak Prize for his article Navigating by Consensus: Developments in the Technique at the United Nations Conference on the Law of the Sea.

References 

Living people
British political scientists
British international relations scholars
Academics of the London School of Economics
Academics of the University of Warwick
Academics of the University of Westminster
Constructivist international relations scholars
Political realists
Fellows of the British Academy
1946 births
Copenhagen School (security studies)
Academic staff of the University of Copenhagen
Academic staff of Jilin University
Alumni of the London School of Economics